Gerd Kvale (born 1955) is a Norwegian psychologist working on obsessive–compulsive disorder.

She graduated as a Candidate of Psychology from the University of Bergen in 1982, and completed her Ph.D. in psychology in 1992. She was appointed professor in clinical psychology at the University of Bergen in 2002. Since 2011 she has been leading an obsessive–compulsive disorder project at the Haukeland University Hospital in Bergen. In 2015 she and her team received the Innovation of the Year in Psychological Science award from the Norwegian Society of Psychological Science.

In 2018 she was featured in Time magazine, along with Bjarne Hansen, due to their successful four-day exposure therapy program which treats obsessive–compulsive disorder.

References

1955 births
Living people
Norwegian psychologists
Norwegian women psychologists
University of Bergen alumni
Academic staff of the University of Bergen